The Koenigsegg Regera is a limited production, plug-in hybrid grand touring sports car manufactured by Swedish automotive manufacturer Koenigsegg. It was unveiled at the March 2015 Geneva Motor Show. The name Regera is a Swedish verb, meaning "to reign" or "to rule." Koenigsegg produced only 80 units of the car, most of which were sold upon unveiling.

The Regera was developed and designed to be a more practical, luxurious, grand touring alternative to the rest of Koenigsegg's lightweight sports car lineup; initially the Agera and currently the Jesko. As a result, it is less focused on-track performance and spartan weight reduction and more focused on the smooth and instant delivery of power provided by its overhauled powertrain. Koenigsegg states that the Regera will be one of the most powerful and fastest-accelerating hybrid production cars produced.

The introduction of the Regera alongside the Agera RS in 2015 resulted in Koenigsegg, for the first time ever, simultaneously having two models in production. This role was passed from the Agera to the Jesko in 2019, which briefly shared the production line with the Regera when Jesko production began in late 2021.

Conception 
Koenigsegg founder Christian von Koenigsegg purchased a Tesla Model S P85+ in 2013 and was impressed by the car's ability to instantly deliver power without the need for a downshift or to wait for turbo lag. He was especially impressed with the direct and intuitive experience provided by an electric car like the Tesla, remarking that the instantaneous response of the motors was something even a Formula One car could not attain with a traditional internal combustion engine. Von Koenigsegg sought to combine this desirable aspect of electric powertrains with the traditional Koenigsegg experience of a lightweight, powerful sports car.

Realizing some form of compromise was necessary, von Koenigsegg decided to look to a hybrid solution. By removing the traditional 7-speed dual-clutch transmission and switching to a single-gear direct-drive system, Koenigsegg mitigated the added weight of the three electric motors and a 4.5 kW·h battery pack installed in the Regera as compared to the previous Agera models. The single-gear electrical solution also provided the instant response that von Koenigsegg sought, while the onboard internal combustion engine would then maintain the rapid acceleration and power at higher speeds where the electric motors are less effective.

Development 

The Regera was designed with a combination of the CATIA software suite and Autodesk Inventor, with AutoCAD Electrical being primarily used to redesign the vehicle's electrical systems from past Koenigsegg models. According to Koenigsegg Technical Director Jon Gunner, the Regera makes use of several power nodes to connect wiring throughout the car compared to the single power node of previous models, which saves weight.

Koenigsegg uses 3D printing technologies to manufacture many parts of the Regera. This includes static components like details in the interior of the car under the upholstery and the large electrical exhaust port at the rear of the car, as well as dynamic components like the variable-geometry turbocharger in the engine. This manufacturing technique allowed Koenigsegg to better tune airflow through the turbochargers and achieve a more complex inner housing shape which was impossible with conventional methods.

The Regera was used by NVIDIA to introduce Project Holodeck, a virtual reality environment capable of importing and manipulating high-detail 3D models. This technology was used by Koenigsegg engineers to collaborate on design ideas in real-time and could allow customers to experience their custom made vehicle in VR before it is purchased or built.

Specifications
The Regera is a two-door targa top with a detachable roof that can be stowed in the boot. It is the first hybrid car to be produced by Koenigsegg, as well as the first vehicle to use their Direct-Drive System for power delivery. As the company's 'grand touring' oriented offer in their two-car lineup, the Regera focuses more on interior luxury and daily usability instead of hardcore track performance like the Jesko.

Powertrain

The Regera has a reported total power output of  through a hybrid powertrain. As in general, the Regera's internal combustion engine (ICE) generates its greatest power only at high rpm; however, due to the fixed gear, this corresponds to very high speeds.

Internal combustion engine 

The Internal Combustion Engine (ICE) is a mid-rear mounted, in-house developed, twin-turbocharged V8 engine with a 5.0-litre displacement. The engine utilizes dry sump lubrication and dual overhead camshafts, and has a cylinder bank angle of 90º. A flex fuel sensor is installed in the fuel tank to detect E85 biofuel, which increases this power output by an unspecified amount. The ICE is rev-limited at 8,250 rpm.

Electric motors 
One  YASA 400 Motor Generator Unit mounted on the crankshaft acts as starter and generator and supplies torque fill; and two  YASA 750 wheel-shaft mounted electric motors drive each rear wheel and provide torque vectoring and manages traction. The electric motors are powered by a 4.5 kWh, 800 volt, 75 kg liquid cooled battery pack developed by Rimac Automobili, making it the first 800-volt production car. Koenigsegg claims that the battery pack is the most power-dense battery pack ever created for a production car.

Under braking, the kinetic energy recovery system in the Regera can regenerate up to 150 kW of power to recharge the battery during operation.

Transmission
Christian von Koenigsegg invented the Koenigsegg Direct-Drive System (KDD), and it was developed for the Regera by the Koenigsegg Advanced Engineering Team. The KDD system effectively eliminates the need for a transmission and allows for pure EV (electric vehicle) mode. The Regera doesn't have a traditional multi-gear transmission but instead features a single-speed fixed-gear transmission, often called a direct-drive, with a 2.73:1 reduction ratio, meaning the crankshaft mounted on the ICE will rotate 2.73 times for every 1 time that the output shaft of the direct-drive mechanism will rotate.

At speeds below 30 mph, the wheel shaft electric motors mostly propel the car through the use of a hydraulic coupling that lets the ICE and the crankshaft mounted electric motor slip. In reverse, only the wheel shaft electric motors propel the car. Above 30 mph, the RPM of the crankshaft mounted electric motor and internal combustion engine are proportional to wheel speed through locking of the hydraulic coupling. However, Christian von Koenigsegg described and demonstrated how the Regera features a steering-wheel-mounted paddle that simulates a traditional downshift by initiating slip of the hydraulic coupling connecting the crankshaft to the output shaft. This results in higher RPM of the ICE and the crankshaft mounted electric motor and therefore higher power at lower speeds than what would have been possible if the coupling would have been locked at all times. Koenigsegg reported that the omission of a gearbox and addition of electric motors and battery only added 88 kg (194 lb) compared to what the Regera would have weighed with the same combustion engine but a 7-speed dual-clutch transmission (DCT) and no electric motors or batteries.

Suspension 

The Regera features a similar suspension layout to the preceding Agera models, with double wishbone suspension at the front and rear axles. The wishbones are manufactured from chrome-molybdenum steel tubes, which was chosen over carbon-fibre due to the significant cost and complexity of the latter option. The suspension incorporates special "Z" shaped anti-roll bars that connect to the body at only one point (as opposed to two for traditional "U" shaped bars). Also returning from the Agera models is Koenigsegg's 'Triplex' damper system, which consists of three custom Öhlins shock absorbers on the rear suspension subsystem. While anti-dive forces under heavy braking are achieved by obliquely mounting the top wishbones in the front of the car, this mounting position could not be achieved in the rear. Therefore, the purpose of the third 'Triplex' rear damper is to provide anti-squat forces under hard acceleration.

Wheels
The tyres are Michelin Pilot Sport 4S' with codes of 275/35 ZR 19 (100Y) for the front and 345/30 ZR 20 (106Y) for the rear. The car comes with track focused Michelin Pilot Sport Cup 2 tyres when equipped with the Ghost package.

Aerodynamics 

Like its other production counterparts, the Regera is equipped with active aerodynamics for optimized downforce. At the rear is a foldable hydraulic wing, and at the front are active flaps that can modify the flow of air under the car.

Before the 2018 Geneva Motor Show, Koenigsegg revealed the optional 'Ghost' package for the Regera. This package extends the front splitter and the side sills, adds canards to the front fenders, and adds fixed winglets to the rear quarter panels. Koenigsegg claims that, with the Ghost package installed, the downforce of the Regera is "increased by more than 20 percent".

Interior features

The Regera includes added insulation to help add to the luxury by reducing cabin noise caused by the wind and powertrain along with 8-way electrically adjustable memory foam seats included as an added luxury item over previous models. The Regera also includes many new technical features such as a Neonode 9-inch infrared infotainment system, a complete camera system with recording capabilities (front, inner, and rear), Apple CarPlay, a new sound system, ambient lighting, and 4G and Wi-Fi connectivity. It also features front and rear parking sensors.

The wireless connectivity capabilities of the Regera allow for Koenigsegg to send over-the-air firmware and software updates to each car as necessary. This allows for the remote modification of parameters such as the power band of the electric motors or throttle response without the need for physical work on the car.

The Regera has active engine mounts for the ICE and transmission to rest on. The engine mounts are designed to stay soft at lower speeds, significantly reducing vibrations and engine noise, adding to the luxury effect of the vehicle. While driving more aggressively or at higher speeds, the engine mounts will firm up, giving greater lateral response to the driver.

Exterior features 
The day-time running lamps on the Regera was designed to resemble a constellation, with the carbon-fibre background resembling the night sky. In addition, the headlamps can actively vent out condensation through two small fans installed in each lamp.
Koenigsegg claims that the Regera is the first "fully-robotized" car. All openings and wing mirrors are fitted with proximity sensors to safeguard against the doors striking nearby objects (curb, low roof, etc.) while opening or closing. The vehicle features hydraulic pumps and accumulators to control the active front and rear wings, as well as active chassis control and lifting. Hydraulic lifters were added to the already existing pumps and accumulators to allow for all body panels on the vehicle to be remotely operated.

The Regera uses a fishtail-style dual exhaust system designed by Akrapovič constructed of titanium, Inconel, and stainless steel. The large central exhaust pipe under the charging port is not used to vent exhaust from the ICE, rather, it expels hot air from the cooling system for the batteries and electronics in the car.

Performance
Koenigsegg also claims that the acceleration from  requires 3.9 seconds.

Comparison with other Koenigsegg models

 Time for Agera RS with 1MW engine upgrade.
 Official acceleration tests performed by Koenigsegg with internal roll cage installed

World record 
On 23 September 2019, the Regera broke the  acceleration record for a production car with a time of 31.49 seconds. This is 1.8 seconds faster than the previous record, also held by Koenigsegg but set by the Agera RS. The record was set in Råda Military Airfield in Lidköping, Sweden with a car driven by factory test driver Sonny Persson.

The run was conducted over a combination of runway and taxiway due to insufficient track length and as a safety precaution.

Reception 

Reviews of the Regera have been generally positive, with most descriptions of the driving experience being centered around the unique feel of the Direct-Drive system. Automobile magazine writes that driving the Regera is "a new sensation, perhaps a combination of the feel you get from electric cars like the Model S, which also has no conventional gearbox, and a combustion-engine vehicle with a continuously variable transmission". Top Gear writes that at low speeds, the noise and drive of the Regera feels like "a lazy American V8 muscle car", but that at higher speeds, the car is "instantly alert" and "corners flat and tenaciously". Other minor criticisms of the driving experience include the electric motor activation delay and the "slight CVT feel" upon sudden acceleration. However, it is important to note that each car's transmission feel and power delivery can be tuned to the request of the customer.

The Regera's design has received acclaim from reviewers, with Top Gear remarking "there's real beauty in its long tail and taut curves". Global Car Brands praised the car for differing from the common trend of hyper-aggressive fronts, instead going for a "happy looking face". In particular, reviewers commend the car for its remarkable exterior paint jobs, which are described in separate reviews as being "sensational", "absolutely stunning", and "gloriously wonderful". On the inside, Automobile magazine compliments the "well-designed" and "wildly special" interior of the car, however remarks that it may be topped by the opulence of the Bugatti Chiron, a direct competitor to the Regera.

Production
Koenigsegg planned to build 80 units of the Regera, making it the largest single-vehicle production run from the company until the introduction of the Jesko in 2019, of which the company plans to build 125 units. All build slots sold out on 13 June 2017 to customers and dealerships, just over two years after the initial unveiling of the car in Geneva. The Regera was built in both left- and right-hand drive configurations for the British and Australian markets.

Special editions

A number of special editions of the Regera have been built on customer request. These special editions usually involve custom paint jobs or carbon fibre work, special interior materials, and optional aerodynamics packages. Such special editions include:
Regera "d'Elegance" (chassis no. 139)
Regera KNC (Koenigsegg Naked Carbon, chassis no. 209)
Regera "Raven" (chassis no. 145)
Regera "Kejsare" (chassis no. 173)
Regera "Malin" (chassis no. 129)
Regera "by Echo" (chassis no. 159)
Regera "168" (chassis no. 168)
Regera "Casper" (chassis no. 184)
Regera "Golden Knight" (chassis no. 186)
Regera "Elegua" (chassis no. 226)
Regera "Gotham" (chassis no. 227)
Regera "Asger" (chassis no. 228)
Regera "Lejonet" (chassis 231)
Regera "Honey" (chassis no. 500, not part of the typical chassis sequence but purchased by the owner)

In popular culture 
The Regera has been featured in many video games since its release, first appearing in the mobile game Real Racing 3 in December 2015. Since then, it has appeared in several console games including Forza Motorsport 7, Forza Horizon 3 and 4, Driveclub, and Need for Speed: No Limits, Payback, The Crew 2 and Heat. The Ghost Package-equipped Regera appears in the mobile game CSR Racing 2.

On 10 July 2020, Koenigsegg released a short film titled "Time to Reign" in which the Regera is featured as the subject of a heist, with many external driving shots at Koenigsegg's headquarters in Ängelholm. The Regera also appeared in an episode of the web series Jay Leno's Garage on 10 September 2018.

Gallery

See also 

 List of production cars by power output

References

External links

Koenigsegg vehicles
Plug-in hybrid vehicles
Rear mid-engine, rear-wheel-drive vehicles
Cars introduced in 2015
Grand tourers
Flagship vehicles